Charpentiera obovata, known as broadleaf pāpala, is a species of flowering shrub or small tree in the family Amaranthaceae, that is endemic to Hawaii.

References

Amaranthaceae
Trees of Hawaii
Endemic flora of Hawaii
Plants described in 1826
Flora without expected TNC conservation status